This was the first of seven editions of the tournament in the 2021 tennis season.

Luis David Martínez and David Vega Hernández won the title after defeating Szymon Walków and Jan Zieliński 6–4, 3–6, [10–8] in the final.

Seeds

Draw

References

External links
 Main draw

Biella Challenger Indoor - Doubles